The Headless Chickens was a New Zealand band. Going against the grain of the Dunedin sound that dominated the Flying Nun Records roster at the time, the Headless Chickens made extensive use of electronic instruments in their music.

History

The Headless Chickens recorded three albums, Stunt Clown (1988), Body Blow (1991), and Greedy (1997), plus various EPs for Flying Nun Records in the 1980s and 1990s.

The band first became known in New Zealand when they won the 1987 Rheineck Beer Rock award. The prize money from the award went into the funding for their innovative (for its use of sampling) 1988 debut album Stunt Clown.

The 1988 CD release of Stunt Clown compiled the vinyl release of this name with the 1986 Headless Chickens EP.

A second album, Body Blow, appeared in 1991 which featured singer Fiona McDonald. It was during this time with McDonald that the Headless Chickens would attract their widest audience. Two versions of Body Blow were released, with the revised and expanded 1993 version going double platinum in New Zealand.

This album spawned the single "Cruise Control" which became a hit in New Zealand and (in a remixed form) Australia. "Cruise Control" was notable for its sampling, particularly for elements of Shona Laing's 1973 single "1905" and the Crocodiles' 1980 single "Tears". Cruise Control was released in the 1980s and was quickly added to the flying nun records

At the time, the band's use of electronic elements and sampling in a "rock" setting was out of the ordinary and had an influence on many other N.Z. bands that followed them.

The follow-up 1997 Greedy album took several years to complete, and during that time several band members left, including singer McDonald. Greedy contained the track "George" which became a No. 1 hit single in their home country; "George" was the first (and so far, only) track from the Flying Nun Records label to achieve No. 1 status.

The Headless Chickens split up soon after the release of Greedy.

In 2002 Flying Nun Records released a 2CD best-of compilation named ChickensHits.

In July 2008 it was announced that the band would reform to play the Homebake Festival in Sydney, Australia on 6 December. The line-up would feature both Chris Matthews and Fiona McDonald. They played further concerts in Australia and New Zealand and were scheduled to play at the Auckland Big Day Out in January 2009.

On 27 January 2018, bassist Grant Fell died of cancer at the age of 56.

Discography

Albums

Singles

Featured appearances
The group have appeared on many compilations and soundtracks since 1990 in both New Zealand and Australia.  The following is a list of these albums that have featured tracks by the Headless Chickens.

Awards

|-
| 1987
| Headless Chickens
| Rheineck Rock Award
|  
|-
| 1992
| Body Blow
| NZ Music Awards - Album of the Year
|  
|-
| 1992
| "Cruise Control"
| NZ Music Awards - Single of the Year
|  
|-
| 1992
| Fiona McDonald
| NZ Music Awards - Best Female Vocalist
|  
|-
| 1992
| Headless Chickens
| NZ Music Awards - Best Group
|  
|-
| 1992
| "Cruise Control"
| NZ Music Awards - Best Video
|  
|-
| 1992
| Rex Visible (Body Blow)
| NZ Music Awards - Best Producer
|  
|-
| 1994
| "Juice"/"Choppers"
| NZ Music Awards - Single of the Year
|  
|-
| 1994
| Fiona McDonald
| NZ Music Awards - Best Female Vocalist
|  
|-
| 1994
| Headless Chickens
| NZ Music Awards - Best Group
|  
|-
| 1994
| Headless Chickens
| NZ Music Awards - International Achievement
|  
|-
| 1994
| Johnny Ogilvie ("Mr Moon")
| NZ Music Awards - Best Video
|  
|-
| 1995
| Johnny Ogilvie ("Cruise Control")
| NZ Music Awards - Best Video
|  
|-
|}

References

External links
AudioCulture profile
Headless Chickens on Flying Nun

APRA Award winners
New Zealand rock music groups
Flying Nun Records artists